Jainag (also Romanized as Jā'īnag; also known as Gavainak, Goinak, Govīnak, Jā’enak, Jā'īnak, Jāvīnak, and Kūyenak) is a village in Delvar Rural District, Delvar District, Tangestan County, Bushehr Province, Iran. At the 2006 census, its population was 2,152, in 482 families.

References 

Populated places in Tangestan County